Peñas Blancas is a district of the San Ramón canton, in the Alajuela province of Costa Rica.

History 
Peñas Blancas was created on 13 March 1951 by Decreto Ejecutivo 91.

Geography 
Peñas Blancas has an area of  km² and an elevation of  metres.

Demographics 

For the 2011 census, Peñas Blancas had a population of  inhabitants.

Transportation

Road transportation 
The district is covered by the following road routes:
 National Route 702
 National Route 936

References 

Districts of Alajuela Province
Populated places in Alajuela Province